Sriram Balaji and Vishnu Vardhan were the defending champions but chose not to defend their title.

Gianluca Mager and Andrea Pellegrino won the title after defeating Matt Reid and Luke Saville 6–4, 7–6(9–7) in the final.

Seeds

Draw

References
 Main draw

Chennai Open Challenger - Doubles